Meldon Edises Levine (born June 7, 1943) is an American attorney and former Democratic Congressman from California. He served in the United States House of Representatives from 1983 to 1993.

Early life
On June 7, 1943, Levine was born in Los Angeles, California. He graduated from Beverly Hills High School in 1960.

Education
Levine was student body president (1963–64) and valedictorian at the University of California, Berkeley. After attending Princeton (MPA 1966) and Harvard (JD 1969) Universities, he was admitted to the California bar in 1970.

Career
In 1970, after Levine was admitted to the California bar, he set up a private law practice.

He was a legislative assistant to U.S. Senator John V. Tunney from 1971 to 1973. He served in the California State Assembly from 1977 to 1982. He served in the U.S. House of Representatives from 1983 to 1993.  He supported the 1991 Gulf War Authorization Act, which authorized the use of United States Armed Forces pursuant to United Nations Security Council Resolution 678.

In 1992, Levine ran for U.S. Senate; he lost in the Democratic primary, to Barbara Boxer, who went on to win the general election in November.

In August 2013 Levine was appointed by Los Angeles Mayor Eric Garcetti to become a member of the Board of Water and Power Commissioners. On September 11, 2013, Levine was confirmed to become a member of the Board of Water and Power Commissioners by the Los Angeles City Council. Levine is the president of the Board of Water and Power Commissioners.

Levine is a partner in law firm Gibson, Dunn & Crutcher and a member of the board of directors of the Pacific Council on International Policy.

Personal
Levine is married to New Yorker journalist Connie Bruck. He has three children from a previous marriage: Adam, Jake and Cara. He lives in Pacific Palisades.

See also
 List of Jewish members of the United States Congress

References

External links
 
 

1943 births
Living people
Democratic Party members of the United States House of Representatives from California
Democratic Party members of the California State Assembly
Politicians from Los Angeles
California lawyers
Harvard Law School alumni
Princeton University alumni
University of California, Berkeley alumni
People associated with Gibson Dunn

Members of Congress who became lobbyists